WISE J071322.55−291751.9 (designation abbreviated to WISE 0713−2917) is a brown dwarf of spectral class Y0, located in constellation Canis Major at approximately 23 light-years from Earth.

Discovery
WISE 0713−2917 was discovered in 2012 by J. Davy Kirkpatrick and colleagues from data collected by the Wide-field Infrared Survey Explorer (WISE) in the infrared at a wavelength of 40 cm (16 in), whose mission lasted from December 2009 to February 2011. In 2012 Kirkpatrick et al. published a paper in The Astrophysical Journal, where they presented discovery of seven new found by WISE brown dwarfs of spectral type Y, among which also was WISE 0713−2917.

Distance

See also
The other six discoveries of brown dwarfs, published in Kirkpatrick et al. (2012):
	
WISE 0146+4234 (Y0)
WISE 0350−5658 (Y1)
WISE 0359−5401 (Y0)
WISE 0535−7500 (≥Y1)
WISE 0734−7157 (Y0)
WISE 2220−3628 (Y0)

References

Brown dwarfs
Y-type stars
Canis Major
WISE objects